Sarras (also Romanized as Sarrās, Sārās, and Sar Rā's) is a village in southern Iran in the Deh Kahan Rural District, Aseminun District, Manujan County, Kerman Province. At the 2006 census, its population was 1,883, in 389 families.

References 

Populated places in Manujan County